The members of the 2nd General Assembly of Newfoundland were elected in the Newfoundland general election held in May 1837. The general assembly sat from July 3, 1837 to 1841.

The assembly continue to meet at the Old Court House.

William Carson was chosen as speaker.

An Education Act passed in 1836 established a public education system in the province.

In 1838, Edward Kielley was alleged to have threatened and insulted John Kent, a member of the assembly, regarding remarks made by Kent in the assembly. The assembly considered these actions to violate the parliamentary privilege of the Newfoundland legislature and ordered Kielley arrested. The Supreme Court of Newfoundland upheld the actions of the assembly but in 1842 the ruling was overturned by the Judicial committee of the British Privy Council which ruled that the privileges of the British House of Commons were not transferred to colonial legislatures.

Sir Henry Prescott served as civil governor of Newfoundland.

Members of the Assembly 
The following members were elected to the assembly in 1837:

Notes:

By-elections 
By-elections were held to replace members for various reasons:

Notes:

References 

Newfoundland
002